Joseph Michael Cooke (born 30 May 1997) is an English cricketer. He made his first-class debut on 28 March 2017 for Durham MCCU against Gloucestershire as part of the Marylebone Cricket Club University fixtures. He made his List A debut on 22 July 2021, for Glamorgan in the 2021 Royal London One-Day Cup. On 16 August 2021, in the semi-final of the tournament, Cooke took his first five-wicket haul in List A cricket. He made his Twenty20 debut on 26 May 2022, for Glamorgan in the 2022 T20 Blast.

Cooke studied at Durham University.

References

External links
 

1997 births
Living people
Alumni of Durham University
English cricketers
Durham MCCU cricketers
Sportspeople from Hemel Hempstead
Hertfordshire cricketers
Glamorgan cricketers